In January and February 1983, a representative team of West Indian cricket players undertook a so-called "Rebel tour" to South Africa, to play a series of matches against the South African team. At the time, the International Cricket Council (ICC) had placed a moratorium on international cricket teams making tours of South Africa, due to the nation's government policy of apartheid, leaving South Africa with no official international competition.

Background
The West Indian players were mainly talented understudies struggling to break into the great West Indian Test team of the period, or men past their prime as Test players. First-class cricketers in the West Indies were then poorly paid and the participants, many of whom had irregular or no employment in the off-season, received between US$100,000 and US$125,000 for the two tours. West Indies cricket was so strong that Clive Lloyd had little need for the likes of Lawrence Rowe, Collis King and Sylvester Clarke. Rowe has since stated that he and several other players were disillusioned with the West Indies Cricket Board for not selecting them despite good performances.

The previous season a Sri Lankan team toured South Africa which was theorised to have helped pave the way for players from the West Indies to tour by demonstrating it possible for a non-white cricket team to tour South Africa safely.

The strength of Caribbean cricket was evidenced in the 'international' matches, where South Africa received their first real test. A fiercely contested four-week series in 1982–3 took 'unofficial internationals' to new heights, the Springboks winning the one-day series 4–2 while the 'Test' series was drawn 1–1. The dominant theme of the match-ups was West Indian fast bowling. Colin Croft was one of four World Cup winners in the party. Their pace battery, featuring Clarke, Croft, Stephenson, Bernard Julien and Ezra Moseley, the Springbok batsmen wore helmets for the first time. The frantic first series, organised in secret and conducted on the hoof, set up a fierce battle when the West Indians returned for a full tour the following season.

Touring team

Tour matches

First Test

Second Test

First ODI

Second ODI

Third ODI

Fourth ODI

Fifth ODI

Sixth ODI

CEB Rice Benefit Match

Aftermath
The West Indian players were given life bans in all forms of the game, depriving West Indian cricket of a large amount of player talent. Despite earning much money from the tour many West Indian players faced social stigma and unemployment afterwards with nine leaving the Caribbean altogether as a result. Though the ban was lifted in 1989 only one of the players, Ezra Moseley, was selected to play for the West Indies post 1989.

References

Further reading

West Indian cricket tours of South Africa
Cricket and apartheid
Cricket controversies
1983 in cricket